The Diamond Crown of Bulgaria is a royal regalia (along with the Sceptres of Ferdinand I and Boris III), that existed during the Bulgaria monarchy from 1878 to 1946.

The Bulagrian government ordered the crown as national present at the occastion of the wedding of Princess Marie Louise of Bourbon-Parma to Prince Ferdinand I. It was made by the Viennese jewellers Köchert.

The original top of the crown was replaced from the French Fleur-de-lis to the Bulgarian boll with a cross on top of it. The crown was first used by Princess Marie Louise of Bourbon-Parma on her wedding to Prince Ferdinand I. It later passed to and was used by Ferdinand's second wife, Princess Eleonore Reuss of Köstritz.

The current whereabouts of the crown is unknown.

See also
 Coronation of the Bulgarian monarch
 Regalia of the Bulgarian monarch

References

External links
 Diamond Crown of Bulgaria
 Eleanore wearing the Diamond Crown

Crown jewels
Individual crowns
Bulgarian monarchy